The Lagos carnival also known as the Fanti or Caretta Carnival of Lagos, is the most prominent in West Africa. The carnival is usually held during the Lagos Black Heritage Festival, a colorful folk festival which holds annually in Lagos. The origins of the carnival dates back to the Lagos colonial period when the Brazilian former slave returnees came back to reside in Lagos in the 19th century. The carnival was re-instated in 2010. The event is usually centered on Lagos Island, filled with troop displays of costumes and various forms of entertainment including music and dancing. The carnival portrays an eclectic mixture of Nigerian, Brazilian and Cuban heritage of the city.  The Lagos Carnival is filled with amazing and memorable activities.This festival is one of the most colorful and celebrated cultural festivals in Nigeria and quite notable in Africa generally.

References

Annual events in Lagos
Brazilian Nigerian
Carnivals in Nigeria
Cuban diaspora
Parades in Lagos